Bristol Township is a township in Greene County, Iowa, USA.

History
Bristol Township was established in 1871.

References

Townships in Greene County, Iowa
Townships in Iowa
1871 establishments in Iowa
Populated places established in 1871